Bradford Town Hall may refer to:

 Bradford City Hall, Bradford, West Yorkshire, England (previously named Bradford Town Hall)
 Bradford Town Hall (New Hampshire), United States, listed on the NRHP in New Hampshire